Srđan Pirivatrić is a Serbian historian and diplomat.

Biography 
He was born in 1966 in Belgrade. In 1984, Pirivatrić completed his secondary education, and in 1990 he graduated from the Belgrade University in History. In 1990-1995 he passed a post-graduate qualification at the same university, in the area of the History of Byzantium, and in 1995 Pirivatrić  received a master's degree after defending of Master's thesis "Scope and Character of the Samuil's state according to Byzantine sources", refuting the claims of Yugoslav and Macedonian historiographies about its "Macedonian character" and acknowledging that it was the last stage of the existence of the First Bulgarian Empire.

Between 1989 and 1991, Pirivatrić was a librarian at the Byzantine Seminar at the Belgrade University's Philosophy Faculty. From 1991 to 1999, he was assistant professor at the Byzantine History Department at the same university, and in 1999-2000 he was a research fellow at the Institute of Byzantine Studies at the Serbian Academy of Sciences and Arts. Between 2001-2005, he was on a diplomatic service, until 2003 he was First Secretary of the Serbia and Montenegro Embassy in Sofia, and until 2005 in Athens. After 2005, Pirivatrić became a research associate at the Institute of Byzantine Studies and a lecturer at Belgrade University. In 2013, he defended his PhD in history at Belgrade University. He is also a lecturer at the universities of Athens, Sofia and Thessaloniki. Author of some 50 scientific papers, published in Yugoslavia, Serbia, Bulgaria, Greece, France, Great Britain, Poland, Slovakia and Hungary.

He was awarded in 2009 by the president of Bulgaria Georgi Parvanov for his contribution to the good relation between the Bulgarian and the Serbian people.

References

1966 births
20th-century Serbian historians
Members of the Serbian Academy of Sciences and Arts
Diplomats from Belgrade
Serbian medievalists
Balkan studies
Serbian Byzantinists
Living people
Academic staff of the University of Belgrade
Scholars of Byzantine history
21st-century Serbian historians